Osaka or Ōsaka is a Japanese surname that may refer to

, Japanese writer
, Japanese animator, character designer and illustrator
Mari Osaka (born 1996), Japanese tennis player, sister of Naomi
, Japanese Communist
, Japanese pastor, theologian and newspaper columnist
Naomi Osaka (born 1997), Japanese tennis player, sister of Mari
, Japanese manga artist
, Japanese voice actor and radio personality

Fictional characters
Naru Osaka, character from Sailor Moon
, a character from the media project Love Live! Nijigasaki High School Idol Club

Japanese-language surnames